This is a list of seasons played by Tennis Borussia Berlin in German football from the 1963–64 season onwards. TeBe played two seasons in the highest tier of the German football league system, the Bundesliga, during the mid-1970s. The club also holds the record for the number of Berliner Landespokal titles, but has only ever reached the semi-final stage of the DFB-Pokal once, in 1994. Tennis Borussia top goalscorers in bold were also the division top scorers of that season.

Seasons

Notes

External links 
 Official website of Tennis Borussia Berlin
 Tennis Borussia Berlin season statistics at fussballdaten.de 

Seasons
German football club statistics
German football club seasons